is a subway station in Nerima, Tokyo, Japan, operated by the Tokyo subway operator Tokyo Metro.

Lines

Station layout
The station consists of two opposed side platforms serving two tracks shared by both Yurakucho Line and Fukutoshin Line services. The platforms are equipped with chest-height platform edge doors.

Platforms

History
The station opened on 24 June 1983, on the Yūrakuchō Line. Fukutoshin Line services commenced on 14 June 2008.

The station facilities were inherited by Tokyo Metro after the privatization of the Teito Rapid Transit Authority (TRTA) in 2004.

Chest-height platform edge doors were installed in August 2010.

Surrounding area

 Shakujii River
 Hikawa Shrine
 Johoku-Chuo Park
 Tokyo Oyama High School

See also
 List of railway stations in Japan

References

External links

 Tokyo Metro station information 

Railway stations in Japan opened in 1983
Stations of Tokyo Metro
Tokyo Metro Yurakucho Line
Tokyo Metro Fukutoshin Line
Railway stations in Tokyo